Añjaneyāsana (Sanskrit: अञ्जनेयासन, "Son of Anjani pose"), Crescent Moon Pose, or Ashwa Sanchalanasana (Equestrian Pose) is a lunging back bending asana in modern yoga as exercise. 

It is sometimes included as one of the asanas in the Surya Namaskar sequence, though usually with arms down in that case. Variations include Utthana Pristhasana, Lizard Pose.

Etymology and origins

The name Anjaneya is a matronymic for Hanuman, whose mother's name is Anjani. Hanuman is a central figure in the epic Rāmāyaṇa, and an important Iṣṭa-devatā in devotional worship.

Like many standing asanas, Anjaneyasana was unknown in medieval hatha yoga, and was brought into modern yoga in the 20th century from Indian martial arts. It is used in schools of modern yoga such as Sivananda Yoga. It is included as one of the asanas in Ashtanga Vinyasa Yoga's type 1 Surya Namaskar sequence.

Description 

The asana is entered from a lunge, with the back knee lowered to the ground, the back arched and the arms raised and stretched over the head. The toes of the back foot are pointed back in styles such as Ashtanga Vinyasa Yoga and other styles, the top of the foot on the floor, though in other styles such as Sivananda Yoga the toes are tucked under. The front foot remains in standing position, the hips lowered close to the front foot and the front knee fully bent and pointing forwards. In the full asana, the rear foot is lifted and grasped with both hands, the elbows pointing up.

Variations 

Parivritta Anjaneyasana, a preparatory pose for Parivritta Parsvakonasana (where the rear knee is off the floor), is the rotated form of the pose. This has the opposite elbow to the bent forward knee, and the rear knee on the floor.

Utthana Pristhasana, Lizard pose, is a variant with the forearms on the floor.

Moving the front foot on to its side so the knee comes to the ground enables a transition to a related back bend, Rajakapotasana.

Some teachers use the name Crescent Moon Pose for a lunge with raised knee and raised hands, as in Virabhadrasana I. Some use the name Parivritta Anjaneyasana for Parivritta Parsvakonasana with elbow to knee.

See also 

 Ardha Chandrasana, half moon pose
 Hanumanasana, the front-back splits, the front leg straight out

References 

Backbend asanas
Surya Namaskar
Standing asanas
Asymmetric asanas